METI or Meti or variant, may refer to:

 Meti (Gambela), Ethiopia, the town in southwestern Ethiopia
 Meti (Oromia), Ethiopia, the town in west-central Ethiopia, see Ambo Zuria
 Meti (sex), a Nepalese word for transgender people, see List of transgender-related topics
 Ministry of Economy, Trade and Industry, Japan
 Messaging to Extra-Terrestrial Intelligence (METI or Active SETI), the sending of interstellar messages
 METI (Messaging Extraterrestrial Intelligence), a non-profit organization for sending interstellar messages
 The METI Handmade School in Bangladesh.
 The Middle Eastern Texts Initiative at Brigham Young University's Neal A. Maxwell Institute for Religious Scholarship. 
 METİ (EOD vehicle), explosive ordinance disposal vehicle of the Turkish Army

See also

Metis (disambiguation)